The Alexander von Humboldt National Forest is a national forest of Peru.

This zone Alexander Von Humboldt published by means of R.M is shaped by the National Forest. Nº 0574-99-AG, corresponding to the department of Ucayali and Areas Authorized for the Use of Incidental Teams to the motosierra named "Castle" or "Chullachaqui" created with R.M. Nº 0654-2000-AG.

National forests of Peru
Alexander von Humboldt